Wilbur Daniel Steele (17 March 1886, Greensboro, North Carolina – 26 May 1970, Stamford, Connecticut) was a U.S. author and playwright. He has been called "America's recognised master of the popular short story" between World War I and the Great Depression.

His short stories are set in American locations and are often highly dramatic. Collections of his stories include The Man Who Saw through Heaven (1927), Best Stories (1946), and Full Cargo (1951). He also wrote novels, including Taboo (1925), That Girl from Memphis (1945), and Their Town (1952). His second wife was actress Norma Mitchell, with whom he co-wrote the play The Post Road.

Works

Fiction
 Storm, 1914
 Ching Ching Chinaman, 1917
 Land's End and Other Stories, 1918
 The Shame Dance and Other Stories, 1923
 Isles of the Blest, 1924
 Taboo, 1925
 Urkey Island, 1926. (Stories.)
 The Man Who Saw Through Heaven and Other Stories, 1927.
 Meat, 1928. Republished as The Third Generation, 1929.
 Tower of Sand and other Stories, 1929.
 Undertow, 1930.
 Diamond Wedding, 1931.
 Sound of Rowlocks, 1938.
 That Girl from Memphis, 1945.
 The Best Stories, 1945.
 Full Cargo: More Stories, 1951.
 Their Town, 1952
 The Way to the Gold, 1955.

Plays
 Contemporaries, produced 1915.
 Not Smart, produced 1916.
 The Giants' Stair, produced 1924.
 The Terrible Woman and Other One Act Plays, 1925. Also includes Not Smart, Ropes.
 (with Norma Mitchell) Any Woman, produced in August 1934 for one-week run.
 (with Norma Mitchell) Post Road, produced 1934; printed 1935.
 (with Anthony Brown) How Beautiful with Shoes, produced 1935. From the story by Steele.
 Luck, in William Kozlenko (ed.) One Hundred Nonroyalty Plays'', 1941.

References

 Steele Profile

External links

 
 
 

 Wilbur Daniel Steele Papers housed at Stanford University Libraries

1886 births
1970 deaths
Writers from Greensboro, North Carolina
American male short story writers
American male novelists
O. Henry Award winners
20th-century American novelists
20th-century American dramatists and playwrights
American male dramatists and playwrights
20th-century American short story writers
20th-century American male writers
Novelists from North Carolina